Hibatullah is an Arabic given name, meaning gift of God.

As name

 Hibatullah Akhundzada, Taliban leader and current head of state of Afghanistan.

Hibatullah ibn Musa Abu Nasr al-Mu'ayyad fi'l-Din al-Shirazi (1000–1078), Persian Isma'ili scholar, philosopher-poet, preacher and theologian
Hibat Allah Abu'l-Barakat al-Baghdaadi (c. 1080–1165), Iraqi Islamic philosopher, physicist, psychologist, physician and scientist
Sa'ad al-Dawla ibn Hibatullah ibn Musahib Ebheri (1240–1291), Persian Jewish physician and statesman

Izz bin Hibatullah Al Hadid (13th-century–1258), Persian Islamic scholar

Arabic masculine given names